Hotel Concord at Union Street N. and Cabarrus Avenue in Concord, North Carolina was completed in 1926 and is a contributing structure to the Union Street North–Cabarrus Avenue Commercial Historic District.

The 46,536-square-foot building is the largest historic property in Cabarrus County, North Carolina and the second-largest privately owned building  in downtown Concord.

Concord National Bank (later First Charter Bank) moved to the newly built Hotel Concord, a six-story Beaux Arts Classical Revival building with arch windows, "faced with ashlar limestone ornamented with classical motifs", designed by William Lee Stoddart.

Union Street Corporation approved the sale of the hotel to Rehab Development in February 2016. The city of Concord agreed to buy properties that were previously part of Fifth Third Bank and planned to donate those to Rehab Development.

In December 2016, work began on the $5.3 million Rehab Development project which included the hotel, the First Charter Bank building, and the Concord Telephone Company building on Cabarrus Avenue. The hotel was converted to 40 apartments on the four upper floors and seven commercial spaces, including an event venue, which was already being used, that included the ballroom, kitchen, lobby and part of the basement.

The View at Hotel Concord began leasing apartments June 1, and Union Street Market opened on the hotel's ground floor in July 2018.

References

External links 

Buildings and structures in Cabarrus County, North Carolina
Historic district contributing properties in North Carolina
Hotel buildings completed in 1926
National Register of Historic Places in Cabarrus County, North Carolina
Hotel buildings on the National Register of Historic Places in North Carolina